Moghia Union is a Union parishad of Kachua Upazila, Bagerhat District in Khulna Division of Bangladesh. It has an area of 21.68 km2 (8.37 sq mi) and a population of 16,444.

References

Unions of Kachua Upazila
Unions of Bagerhat District
Unions of Khulna Division